Hegemony Gold: Wars of Ancient Greece is a real-time strategy game developed and published by Canadian studio Longbow Digital Arts Inc. It began as Hegemony: Philip of Macedon which revolved around the campaigns of Philip II of Macedon. It was originally released on Windows on 11 May 2010. It was updated as Hegemony Gold: Wars of Ancient Greece on 23 February 2011  which added scenarios set in the Peloponnesian War. The game features simultaneous real-time tactical battles and real-time strategic empire management, with a focus on the logistics and planning of military campaigns. It was followed by Hegemony Rome: The Rise of Caesar in May 2014 and Hegemony III: Clash of the Ancients in August 2015. A DLC for Clash, The Eagle King, was released in February 2017.

Reception
According to Steam user reviews the game has a "very positive" rating. GameStar reported that Hegemony: Phillip of Macedon offered "Demanding Real-time Grand Strategy" and gave a 73/100 rating, despite the game's graphics not achieving high standards. Strategy games magazine Armchair General gave Hegemony Gold a rating of 93/100. Furthermore PC Masters rated the game with 84%, Destructoid 75% und GamingXP 70%.

Further reading

References

External links 
 Official Website

2010 video games
2011 video games
Real-time strategy video games
Real-time tactics video games
Windows games
Windows-only games
Video games developed in Canada
Video games set in antiquity
Video games set in Greece
Historical simulation games
Grand strategy video games
Video games with historical settings
Hegemony (video game series)
Single-player video games